Arcushallen is an indoor arena located in Luleå, Sweden. It opened in 1986 and is primarily used for concerts and sporting events.

References

Indoor arenas in Sweden
1986 establishments in Sweden